Astaneh may refer to:
Astaneh-ye Ashrafiyeh, Gilan Province, Iran
Astaneh, Ardestan, Isfahan Province, Iran
Astaneh, Anbarabad, Kerman Province, Iran
Astaneh, Jiroft, Kerman Province, Iran
Astaneh, Markazi, Markazi Province, Iran
Astaneh, Semnan, Semnan Province, Iran
Astaneh Rural District (disambiguation), multiple locations in Iran